Elizabeth Lapovsky Kennedy (born December 3, 1939) was one of the founding feminists of the field of women's studies and is a lesbian historian whose book Boots of Leather, Slippers of Gold: A History of the Lesbian Community (co-authored with Madeline Davis) documents the lesbian community of Buffalo, New York, in the decades before Stonewall.

Biography
Elizabeth "Liz" Lapovsky was born on December 3, 1939 in Brooklyn, New York.  Liz was the second of three children to neurologist Arthur Joseph Lapovsky and Martha Schulman Lapovsky. She attended public schools, notably Erasmus Hall High School, where she excelled in mathematics.  From 1956 to 1960, she attended Smith College, earning a BA in Philosophy in 1960. At Smith, she became aware of her talent and interest in understanding cultural difference by taking a course in classical literature. Deciding she wanted to be an anthropologist, Lapovsky enrolled in an Anthropology MA program at the University of New Mexico. After working on archaeological sites at Seattle, Albuquerque, and Jerusalem under the mentorship of professor Harry Basehart, she changed her focus to social anthropology. Basehart was fond of British social anthropology and encouraged Lapovky to study at Cambridge upon completing her MA. Before leaving for Cambridge, Lapovsky married Perry Kennedy, a beatnik and writer.  Through her marriage to Perry Kennedy, who had more radical leanings developed in Putney work camp, Kennedy became involved with the anti Vietnam-war movement in England. Together, Liz and Perry developed a lifelong commitment to social activism.

Early work
Extensive research and fieldwork of the Waunan people in the Chocó provence, Colombia led to her 1972 Ph.D. in social anthropology from Cambridge University. While at Cambridge, Kennedy produced three documentary films on the indigenous peoples of South America allowing her to later consult with both the Canadian Broadcasting Corporation (CBC) and ITV in Great Britain.

She began her teaching career as a Deganaweda Fellow in American Studies at SUNY Buffalo in 1969, where she remained on faculty until 1998. In 1971, she joined fellow anthropologist Charles Keil on the faculty of the American Studies Program there.  This American Studies program differed from other American Studies programs of the time, because it did not draw primarily on literary and historical methodologies.  At SUNY/Buffalo, American Studies, led by Yale philosopher,  Larry Chisolm, emphasized then new insights from cultural anthropology; in addition, Chisolm encouraged faculty and students to look at American culture from the outside in and from the perspective of marginalized groups inside American society.  In this highly stimulating intellectual environment, Kennedy began to adapt her intellectual training to current social issues and political movements.

Building the field of women's studies
In 1971, Kennedy helped found the Women's Studies College at SUNY Buffalo, one of the first Women's Studies institutions in the United States. Like many other American universities responding to the influence of student demands in the late nineteen sixties, SUNY/Buffalo developed a division to house – perhaps ghettoize – alternative educational enterprises.  In 1971, within this framework, Kennedy participated in the founding of Women's Studies College (WSC). WSC defined itself as follows: "This college is not a place to make women a subject to be studied but a place to break down prejudice built by our socialization about what women are and what they are capable of doing."  Within this division, the university allowed non-faculty to develop and offer courses.  At this early stage in the growth of women's studies, when almost no university faculty had specialized knowledge focused on women, many of the initial courses of WSC – ranging from Auto Mechanics to something else – were offered by what were called "community" teachers, without university credentials but with hands-on knowledge of use to young women interested in alternative visions of women's possibilities in the future.    Honored for her teaching skills, Kennedy developed many of the courses offered by WSC, including Women in Contemporary Society, New Research on Women, Cross-Cultural Study of Women, and the Family as an Institution.

An affirmative action program at SUNY/Buffalo also allowed regular departments to compete for positions from which to hire women and  this allowed for the hiring of two additional women faculty to join Kennedy in this Women's Studies enterprise.  In 1972, literary scholar Lillian Robinson and historian Ellen Carol DuBois joined the faculty of American Studies, from which they worked to build Women's Studies.  The collaboration between Kennedy, Robinson and DuBois, aided by two other faculty supporters of WSC – philosopher Carolyn Korsemeyer and educational sociologist Gail Paradise Kelly – resulted in the 1985 publication of Feminist Scholarship:  Kindling in the Groves of Academe. This study explored the "challenges to the traditional disciplines" of the quickly growing field of Women's Studies.  During the early years, Kennedy defended the Women's Studies Program against charges that it was discriminatory (against men) and that it was intellectually biased (in favor of the equality of the sexes).

Like many other early women's studies programs, WSC faced a major challenge, as the university closed down the alternative educational division in which it was housed. Kennedy recognized the necessity of adapting to a changing institutional environment if the field of women's studies were to survive. The Women's Studies College at SUNY/Buffalo was reformed as a division of the American Studies Department, which had always provided its crucial faculty resources. Kennedy also led the way to another innovation when, in 19xx, Women's Studies SUNY/Buffalo initiated a graduate program – at the Masters level – within the American Studies program.  There local community activists and interested young feminists from around the country were joined by international students, from France, the People's Republic of China and Chile. In the 1980s, under Kennedy's leadership, Women's Studies/American Studies at SUNY/Buffalo acquired new faculty, concentrating on recruiting and supporting women of color. Kennedy remained at SUNY/Buffalo for close to three decades.

In January 1998, Kennedy moved to Tucson, Arizona to become head of the Department of Women's Studies at the University of Arizona. During her tenure there, Kennedy initiated the Women's Plaza of Honor with the Women's Studies Advisory Council, a project to commemorate women's contributions to history, particularly in the southwest, as well as to support the Department of Women's Studies. Fundraising efforts from the Plaza made it possible for the department to create a Ph.D. program in the fall of 2008. Kennedy retired from the University of Arizona, but she remains Emeritus Faculty in the Department of Gender and Women's Studies.

After a conference to reflect on the evolution of the field of Women's Studies after 25 years, Kennedy co-edited a book with Agatha Beins published in 2005 as Women's Studies for the Future: Foundations, Interrogations, Politics.

Lesbian history

Kennedy worked on a thirteen-year community history project in Buffalo, New York with Madeline Davis. The project compiled the oral histories of lesbian women from the 1930s to the 1960s and culminated in 1993 with the publication of Boots of Leather, Slippers of Gold: A History of a Lesbian Community. The book was awarded the 1994 Jesse Barnard Award, the 1994 Ruth Benedict Award, and a 1993 Lambda Literary Award.

Elizabeth Kennedy's pioneering role in the development of modern lesbian history was the result of her search for a different and more responsible way to use her anthropological training, as well as with the changes in her personal life.  She, like many other feminists of her generation, left her marriage, fell in love with a woman, and came out as a lesbian.  Her partner, Barbara "Bobbi" Prebis, was one of her major informants for her thirteen-year research project (initiated in 1978) into the social and cultural character of the largely working class lesbian community of Buffalo New York from the 1930s to the 1950s. Based on this research, Kennedy, in collaboration with Madeline Davis, published in 1993 the pathbreaking community study Boots of Leather, Slippers of Gold.

In the early works of US lesbian history, Boots of Leather, Slippers of Gold stands out for its rigorous oral history methodology.  In the process of researching and writing the book, the authors not only drew information and perspectives from veteran members of the Buffalo lesbian community, but returned over and over again to that community with their results, sharing various iterations of the manuscript, both to make sure that they were accurately representing those about whom they were writing; and to return the results of their researches to the community itself.  As a result of this work, Kennedy went on to become an important figure among oral historians in the US and internationally and has remained a central figure in lesbian and LGBTQ history in general.

Secondly, the authors' scrupulous method of in depth interviewing, of careful listening to their informants, and of probing analysis, produced an account of mid century lesbian sexuality that was striking and influential for its originality.  Written at a time when lesbian feminist politics was still uncomfortable with older lesbian traditions of polarized masculine and feminine sex roles, Boots of Leather Slippers of Gold explored these traditions to discover practices and identities that only superficially reflected heterosexual sexuality.   Kennedy and Davis were not primarily interested in creating a usable past for a newly assertive lesbian community, but in uncovering alternative sexual cultures during a period renowned for its hostility to sexual innovation, and to explore what these practices reveal about the sexual possibilities of the period in general.

Boots of Leather, Slippers of Gold focused primarily on working class lesbians and considered lesbianism as a community practice.  In her subsequent research, Kennedy undertook a study that looked at the conditions and possibilities that shaped upper class lesbian life in the context of a single individual, Julia Reinstein in New York and South Dakota.  The most important theoretical contribution to emerge from this research to date has to do with Kennedy's bold evaluation of what Eve Sedgwick earlier called "the epistemology of the closet." In the context of Reinstein's life, Kennedy argued that class privilege and family acceptance allowed upper class lesbians of the interwar period to explore their own complex and shifting sexuality with considerable privacy and confidence. From this perspective, the practices of hiding lesbian relationships, later known as "the closet", no longer looked simply like a practice of oppression. This argument continued Kennedy's insistence on seeing the lesbian past in its own terms, not as an inferior alternative to the present.

Publications
 Feminist Scholarship: Kindling in the Groves of Academe (1983)
 Boots of Leather, Slippers of Gold: A History of a Lesbian Community (1993)
 "Constructing an Ethnohistory of the Buffalo Lesbian Community: Reflexivity, Dialogue, and Politics" with M. Davis in Out in the Field: Reflections of Lesbian and Gay Anthropologists (1996)
 But We Could Never Talk about It': The Structures of Lesbian Discretion in South Dakota" in Inventing Lesbian Cultures in America ed. by Ellen Lewin (1996)
 These Natives Can Speak for Themselves': The Development of Gay and Lesbian Community Studies in Anthropology" in Out in Theory: The Emergence of Gay and Lesbian Anthropology (2002)
 Women's Studies for the Future: Foundations, Interrogations, Politics (2005)

References

External links

 University of Buffalo: ELK
 University of Arizona: ELK Faculty
 ELK Archives
 Boots of Leather on Queer Theory

1939 births
21st-century American women writers
Alumni of the University of Cambridge
American feminists
American lesbian writers
The Bronx High School of Science alumni
Erasmus Hall High School alumni
Lesbian feminists
LGBT anthropologists
LGBT people from New York (state)
Living people
People from Brooklyn
Smith College alumni
University of Arizona faculty
University of New Mexico alumni
Women's studies academics